Drusillas Park is a small  zoo near to Alfriston, in East Sussex, UK. Its exhibits are targeted towards children between 2 and 10 years old.  It attracts between 350,000 and 370,000 visitors per year and until December 2021 was home to the first Hello Kitty-themed attraction in Europe.

The zoo cares for both wild and domestic animals, including ring-tailed lemurs, meerkats, camels, giant anteaters and penguins. There are many hands-on activities, an adventure play area separated for different age groups, an indoor soft play centre, and the Safari Express train ride that runs daily. There are also cafes, shops, and a restaurant.

History 
The enterprise began in 1922 (or 1925) as "Drusilla's Tea Cottage", operated by Douglas Ann and his first wife Drusilla. Animals were included later.
It was closed between April and November 1954 due to a fire. In 1959, management passed to Ann's sons.
It is now owned by Laurence and Christine Smith, who bought it from the Ann family in 1997.

Animals and attractions

The zoo has gradually increased the number of animal exhibits, but still maintains a policy of having mainly smaller animals. The zoo keeps a range of primates including Sulawesi crested macaques, brown capuchin monkeys, black and white colobus monkeys, and lar gibbons. Other residents include servals, African crested porcupines, Rodrigues fruit bats, Asian small-clawed otters, red pandas, Humboldt penguins, binturongs, Chilean flamingos, fennec foxes, Arabian rock hyraxes, two Bactrian camels named Lofty and Roxy and two new Giant Anteaters. Other exhibits include Pet World, Lemurland, a small farmyard, and a walk-through lorikeet aviary where visitors can feed nectar to the birds.

There is also a Discovery Centre, which contains various parts of animals such as pelts, horns, tusks and skins seized from customs.

The 'Zoolympics challenge' lets children compare their abilities (to drag, hang on, jump, shout, run, and hold their breath) against a variety of animals, and record them in a booklet given free at the entrance. Children can also get 'stamp books' to stamp using tick shaped stamps found around the enclosures.

There are many interactive sections of the zoo including 'Mokomo's Jungle Rock' which opened in 2003 and features animatronic animals (mandrill, lemur, vulture, crocodile, spider and snake) who sing about the food chain in the style of The Lion Sleeps Tonight.    
 Further along the route, there is another animatronic crocodile who sings "Never Smile at a Crocodile". Also there are animatronic chickens in the farmyard who sing a song about washing your hands. Past the second crocodile is a cockatoo which copies your voice after you say something to it. At the train ride is an animatronic lion which growls and opens and closes its mouth at you when you pass by.

The adventure play area has swings, slides, and climbing walls, and has been separated into Go Bananas! for children under six and Go Wild! for older children. The indoor soft play centre includes a cafe selling drinks and snacks. An interactive maze, Eden's Eye, lets children discover different worlds, as helped along by a series of clues and mythical creatures.

Go Safari! 

Go Safari! is the biggest project ever undertaken by Drusillas, and represents a million pound investment for the Park. Taking over a year to prepare, the attraction opened in May 2017.

In 2007 Drusillas Park introduced a permanent Thomas & Friends train ride after securing a long-term deal with HIT Entertainment. The passenger train ran to and from Tidmouth Hault (now Mungo's Central Station) for 10 years, from Saturday 31 March 2007 until Sunday 8 January 2017, when the Thomas contract expired without being renewed.

The Safari Express train replaced Thomas at the Park from Friday 31 March 2017, with two further rides replacing the Explorers Lagoon (The Flying Cheetahs and Hippopotobus) opening on Sunday 21 May 2017. Combined, these three new attractions are collectively known as Go Safari!

Hello Kitty Secret Garden

Drusillas Park had the first permanent Hello Kitty attraction in Europe: Hello Kitty Secret Garden, which replaced the old golf course in 2014.

Hello Kitty Secret Garden included three specially designed children's rides: a Hello Kitty car ride, a tea cup ride and a "reach for the sky" hopper ride.

In December 2021 Drusillas announced the end of the seven year partnership with Sanrio, and the closure of the Hello Kitty Secret Garden.

Rainforest Adventure
In 2019, Drusillas opened the Rainforest Carousel, which features 30 rideable rainforest animals. To complement the carousel, the area and rides from the closed Hello Kitty Secret Garden will be reworked into a new attraction called The Rainforest Adventure, due to be completed in May 2022.

Awards and accolades

Rated top attraction in Southern England in The Daily Telegraph'''s '20 Great Family Days Out' (May 2014)

Shortlisted as 'The Best Theme Park Half-term Holidays' by The Times'' (May 2014)

Winner of the 2014 Visitor Attraction of the Year at the Sussex Life Food, Drink and Hospitality Awards.

2014 Sussex Business Matters Award winner in Hospitality, Tourism and Leisure.

Notes

External links

Zoos in England
1922 establishments in England
Tourist attractions in East Sussex
Buildings and structures in East Sussex
2 ft gauge railways in England